Xishui County is a county in the north of Guizhou province, China, bordering Sichuan province to the southwest. It is under the administration of the prefecture-level city of Zunyi.

It was the site of the 2009 Xishui sex trial.

Education
Yang Dezhi Red Army School in Wenshui Town in Xishui County. It opened during the latter portion of the Qing Dynasty and became a Red Army School in 2008.

Tourism
The county is home to the  "Xishui Forest Train" (an electric monorail with an engine shaped like a steam locomotive) which allows for sightseeing through forests and lakes near the city of Xishui.

Climate

Cuisine 
Xishui county is a home of Chinese liquor (baijiu) xijiu.

References

County-level divisions of Guizhou
Zunyi